This is a list of scale model sizes, listing a variety of size ratios for scale models.
 Resource: Scale Conversion Calculator

Model scales

References

Scale model sizes